The 2012 Strade Bianche took place on 3 March 2012. It was the 6th edition of the international classic Strade Bianche.

Cancellara is the first rider to have won the race twice, having previously won in 2008 (when riding for ).

Results

References

Strade Bianche
Strade Bianche
2012 in Italian sport